marble is a Japanese musical duo, originally named The Student's and formed in 1999. The members, Micco and Tatsuya Kikuchi, met and became friends while they were both enrolled in music school. Kikuchi was the main musical support for Micco at that time, who was acting as a solo artist. As they got to know each other better, they decided that they could both make better music if they performed together, and formed The Student's. After getting signed to Warner Music Group's indie label in 1999, they had two releases, but got increasingly more involved in production for other artists and gradually did less and less of their own activities. However, the urge to write and perform their own music came back, and to commemorate this change in attitude, they resigned the company and renamed themselves 'marble' in 2003 and played shows with a backup band, but they split from the band in 2005, and Micco and Kikuchi continued their performances as a duo.

Since their major debut in 2007 with Lantis, they have had a number of releases, including their first album in February 2008. Their songs have been featured in such anime as Hidamari Sketch, Kamichama Karin, KimiKiss pure rouge and Tamayura ~hitotose~.

Their sound is described as calm and soothing "organic pop", most likely because they use very few synthesized instruments and the main instrument is an acoustic guitar.

Members
 - vocals, lyrics, and occasional composition.
 - acoustic guitar, bass guitar, composition and arrangement.

Discography

Singles
 deep breath (released 2003) - limited pressing, 100 copies.
 
 Paper Plane
 
  (acoustic version)
  (acoustic version)

 Free CD (released 2003) - only 50 copies exist. It was handed out at a gig.
 frail
 

 Is it over? (released 2005)
 Is it over?
 
 

 Christmas Gentei Free CD (released 2005.12.24) - handed out only at their gig at Yotsuya Tenmado on Christmas Eve, 2005.
 
 Early Christmas Morning - Cyndi Lauper cover

  (released 2005)
 
 Wind Thread on a Spool
 

  (released 2006 summer)
 
 
 I'm free

  (released 2007.2.21) - ending theme of Hidamari Sketch
 
 
 Mebae Drive (instrumental)
 Rin (instrumental)

  (released 2007.7.25) - second ending theme of Kamichama Karin
 
 Rain Drop
 
 Kūchū Meiro (instrumental)

  (released 2007.10.24) - opening theme of KimiKiss pure rouge
 
 clover
 Aozora loop (instrumental)
 clover (instrumental)

  (released 2008.8.6) - ending theme of Hidamari Sketch × 365
 
 
 Ryūsei Record (instrumental)
 Hummingbird (instrumental)

 Suisai candy - Mashiro-Iro Symphony ~Love Is Pure White~

Albums
  (released 2008.2.6)
 
 
 
 
 Move
 
 
 
 
 
 
 
 
 
  (released 2008.10.15) - This is their first entirely acoustic album, released exclusively on iTunes Japan. It includes previously unreleased songs.
  (released 2009.1.21) - this is a selection of their earlier indie works, many of which are otherwise no longer available.

Collaborations
 Nana Kitade's song  was originally created by marble and named "Tenohira (てのひら)".
 mona records / Subarashiki Jishu Seisaku no Sekai Vol.4 (released 2006)
 8. Rin (凛)
 Ryōko Hirosue's song

External links

 marble official website 
 marblepedia 
 Lantis' official marble website 

Japanese pop music groups
Musical groups established in 1999
Anime musical groups
1999 establishments in Japan